Debbie Davies (born August 22, 1952) is an American blues guitarist.

Davies was born in Los Angeles, California, United States. She has been the featured guitarist in several female based bands including Maggie Mayall and the Cadillacs (led by John Mayall's wife), and Fingers Taylor and the Ladyfinger Revue (who opened for Jimmy Buffett during his 1991 tour). Besides her solo work, Davies is best known for her work with Albert Collins as a member of his band, the Icebreakers, from 1988 to 1991. Over the years she has collaborated with several well-known musicians such as Tommy Shannon and Chris Layton (aka Double Trouble), Coco Montoya, J. Geils and Duke Robillard. She continues to record and tour.

Awards
Davies won the 1997 W. C. Handy Award for Best Contemporary Female Artist. and the 2010 Blues Music Award for Best Traditional Female Artist.

Discography

Albums
 1993 - Picture This
 1994 - Loose Tonight
 1997 - I Got That Feeling
 1998 - Round Every Corner
 1998 - Grand Union
 1999 - Homesick for the Road
 1999 - Tales From The Austin Motel
 2001 - Love The Game
 2003 - Key To Love
 2005 - All I Found
 2007 - Blues Blast
 2009 - Holdin' Court
 2012 - After The Fall
 2015 - Love Spin

Compilation albums
2002 - The Blues: From Yesterday's Masters to Today's Cutting Edge Shanachie, American Roots Songbook, as licensed to St. Clair Entertainment. (includes Debbie Davies: "I Just Want To Make Love To You")

References

External links
 Official website

1952 births
Living people
American blues guitarists
Guitarists from Los Angeles
20th-century American guitarists
Blind Pig Records artists
20th-century American women guitarists
21st-century American women